For the film formats associated with the Instamatic and Pocket Instamatic camera ranges, see 126 film and 110 film respectively.

The Instamatic is a series of inexpensive, easy-to-load 126 and 110 cameras made by Kodak beginning in 1963. The Instamatic was immensely successful, introducing a generation to low-cost photography and spawning numerous imitators.

During its heyday, the range was so ubiquitous that the Instamatic name is still frequently used as a generic trademark to refer to any inexpensive point-and-shoot camera. It is also frequently used incorrectly to describe Kodak's Kodamatic line of instant-picture cameras.

The Instamatic name was also used by Kodak on some Super 8-based home-cine cameras.

History

Early Instamatics

The lead designer for the Instamatic program was Dean M. Peterson (original design by Alexander Gow), also later known for most of the innovations in the point-and-shoot camera revolution of the 1980s. They were the first cameras to use Kodak's new 126 format. The easy-load film cartridge made the cameras very inexpensive to produce, as it provided the film backing plate and exposure counter itself and thus saved considerable design complexity and manufacturing cost for the cameras. A wide variety of print and slide film was sold by Kodak in the 126 format.

The first Instamatic to be released was the Instamatic 50, which appeared in the UK in February 1963. The first model released in the US was the basic Instamatic 100, approximately one month later, which included a built-in flashgun for single-use AG-1 "peanut" bulbs, a feature lacking in the 50. With non-adjustable aperture, focus, and shutter speed ( sec.), it continued in the tradition of Kodak's earlier Brownie cameras, providing a simple snapshot camera anyone could use. 

The first Instamatics went on sale for $16 in early 1963 and were soon followed by the 300 (which had a light meter), the 400 (which had a light meter and a spring driven film advance), and the 700 (which had a light meter and adjustable focus and shutter speeds). Early fixed-focus Instamatics used either a 43 mm 11 plastic lens or a 41 mm 8 Kodar glass lens; the 700 was equipped with a marginally wider and much faster 38 mm Ektar/Ektanar 2.8 lens. The final digit in the model designation (e.g., 100 or 104) refers to the type of flash used: models ending in 0 had a built-in flashgun, while those ending in 4 (introduced in 1965) used flashcubes.

The lineup was soon expanded to include a variety of models from the basic but popular 100/104 to the automatic exposure 800/804, which featured an aluminum chassis, rangefinder, selenium light meter, and clockwork spring wind. The best model made in the USA was the 814, which had a four-element lens and a coupled range-finder. The top-of-the-line model was the Instamatic Reflex (1969), a single-lens reflex camera which was made in Germany and could accept a variety of Retina S-mount lenses. Some German-built Instamatic cameras such as the 250 and 500 included fixed lenses made by Rodenstock and Schneider Kreuznach.

Commercial success

The Instamatic was an instant success; more than 50 million Instamatic cameras were produced between 1963 and 1970. Kodak even gave away a considerable number in a joint promotion with Scott paper towels in the early 1970s in order to generate a large number of new photographers and stimulate lasting demand for its film business.

Many other manufacturers attempted to capitalize on the popularity of the Instamatic with their own 126 cameras, including Canon, Olympus, Minolta, Ricoh, Zeiss Ikon, and even Rollei. Some of these models were far more sophisticated and expensive than the majority of the Kodak cameras: the Rollei SL26, for instance, featured interchangeable lenses (28mm, 40mm, and 80mm), TTL metering, and a rangefinder, and retailed for $300.

A new series of Instamatics was introduced in 1970 to take advantage of the new Magicube flash technology. Magicubes used mechanically triggered pyrotechnic detonators for each bulb, eliminating the need to carry batteries. Instamatics with Magicube sockets were denoted by an "X" in the model number (e.g. X-15 or 55X).

Pocket Instamatic (110 format)  

In 1972, Kodak introduced the Pocket Instamatic series for its new 110 format. The 110 cartridge had the same easy-load design as the 126 format but was much smaller, allowing the cameras to be very compact (hence the "Pocket" designation). The top-of-the-line model was the Pocket Instamatic 60, which featured a stainless steel body, rangefinder, and automatic exposure.

More than 25 million Pocket Instamatics were produced in under three years, and the 110 format remained popular into the 1990s. However, the small negative size (13×17 mm) limited quality when using the film emulsion of the period; in practice most prints were small, so the poor quality was not apparent unless the prints were enlarged beyond postcard size.

Mid-1970s to late 1980s

In 1976, the Instamatic X line was updated for use with the new Flipflash system. These cameras were designated by the addition of the suffix "F" to the model number of the corresponding Magicube model. The basic X-15F was the last Instamatic sold in the United States, remaining on sale until 1988.

Contemporary influence

In 1984, Photo Session, a group of four bronze statues created by J. Steward Johnson, Jr., was installed in Queen Elizabeth Park of Vancouver, British Columbia. The statues depict three people posing in front of a mountainous backdrop with a fourth photographing the group using an Instamatic X-35. One of the three statues posing for the photograph was stolen in June 2008; it was recovered without damage two months later.

Hipstamatic, an automated photograph post-processing application for mobile devices released in 2009, used an interface inspired by the Instamatic to produce similar toy camera-like images and was meant to evoke "a simpler-is-better past, an age where cheap, mass-produced plastic cameras were built to last". It was named as one of the top iPhone application "award winners" by Apple in 2010. A few years later, the Instagram social media network included filters "designed to make digital photographs look like snapshots taken with the toy cameras of yesteryear: the Kodak Brownie, the Instamatic, the Polaroid". The simple, geometric physical Instamatic camera design and square image format captured on 126 film directly inspired the updated Instagram logo and aesthetic. Like Hipstamatic, Instagram was named the "iPhone App Of The Year" by Apple in 2011. The two services were combined in 2012 as the inadvertently circular portmanteau Instamatic in Slate.

Instamatic cameras

Notes

See also
 List of defunct consumer brands

References

External links

 

Kodak cameras
Point-and-shoot cameras
Cameras introduced in 1963
Products introduced in 1963
Defunct consumer brands